The 1901 Wokingham by-election was held on 12 July 1901 after the resignation of the incumbent Conservative MP Oliver Young.  It was retained by the Conservative candidate Ernest Gardner who was unopposed.

References

Unopposed by-elections to the Parliament of the United Kingdom in English constituencies
By-elections to the Parliament of the United Kingdom in Berkshire constituencies
1901 elections in the United Kingdom
1901 in England
July 1901 events
20th century in Berkshire